Chen Hsiu-ching (25 October 1950 – 22 April 2011) was a Taiwanese politician.

She earned an Executive Master of Business Administration degree from Changhua Normal University and was first elected to the Legislative Yuan in 2004. She won reelection against Chen Chin-ting of the Non-Partisan Solidarity Union in 2008, winning  44.96% of the vote. The Congress Watch Foundation rated Chen Hsiu-ching one of the worst legislators in July 2008. In 2009, she opposed an amendment to the Nationality Act proposed by Wu Yu-sheng that would have barred people holding permanent residency in another country from running for public office in Taiwan. Chen died in office at the age of 60 on 22 April 2011, of adenocarcinoma of the lung.

Outside of politics, Chen also served as spokesperson for the Kuang Feng Farmers' Association, and frequently played the role of Mazu on television.

References

1950 births
2011 deaths
Deaths from cancer in Taiwan
Deaths from lung cancer
Members of the 6th Legislative Yuan
Members of the 7th Legislative Yuan
Changhua County Members of the Legislative Yuan
Kuomintang Members of the Legislative Yuan in Taiwan
21st-century Taiwanese women politicians